Crayons is a 2016 Indian Malayalam-language drama film directed by Sajin Lal. The film stars Boban Alummoodan, Sonia, Dinesh Panicker and Binu Adimali. The film is produced under the banner Dream Desert Films by Dr Faiz Aseez, Saneena and the music composed by R Ravi Shankar.

Plot
It narrates the parent's role in developing the mental and physical growth of their children.

Cast
Dr.M Fayas Aziz as Prakash Dev 
Sangeetha Becker as Anamika 
Master Sabarikrishnan as Sam
Master Sibin Zacharia as Sim
Devisree - Arundhathi 
Boban Alummoodan as Shafeek
Sonia as Soni
Dinesh Panicker as Principal
Binu Adimali as  Simon, Worker
Master Dhananjay as Hrishi dev
Azharaf Pezhummood as Auto Shajahan
Sunitha Piravam as Saraswathi, Servant
Sherin Manchery as Shafeek's Wife
Usha as Sofi Teacher
Pramil as Reporter Sanker Dass
Jayasree as Teacher

References

External links
 

Indian drama films